The Réseau Express Régional, commonly abbreviated RER, is a hybrid commuter rail and rapid transit system serving Paris and its suburbs. It acts as a combined city-centre underground rail system and suburbs-to-city-centre commuter rail. In the city centre it acts as a faster counterpart of the Paris Métro, having fewer stops. This has made it a model for proposals to improve transit within other cities. 

The network consists of five lines: A, B, C, D and E. The network has 257 stations and has interchanges with the Métro and commuter rail within the City of Paris and the suburbs. The lines are identified by letters to avoid confusion with the Métro lines, which are identified by numbers. The network is still expanding: RER E, which opened in 1999, is planned for westward extension toward La Défense and Mantes-la-Jolie in two phases by 2024–2026.

Characteristics
Each line passes through the city almost wholly underground and on tracks dedicated to the RER, but some city center tracks are shared between line D and line B. The RER is operated partly by RATP, the authority that operates most public transport in Paris, and partly by SNCF, the national rail operator. The system uses a single fare structure and operates a through-service. Total traffic on the central sections of lines A and B, operated by RATP, was 452 million people in 2006; in the same year, total traffic on all Paris area commuter lines operated by SNCF (both RER and Transilien trains) was 657 million.

RATP manages 65 RER stations, including all stations on Line A east of Nanterre-Préfecture and those on the branch to Saint-Germain-en-Laye. It also operates stations on Line B south of Gare du Nord. Other stations on the two lines and those on lines C, D and E are operated by SNCF. Of the RER stations operated by RATP, 9 have interchanges with Métro lines, and 9 allow transfer to SNCF's Transilien service.

History

Origins

Its roots are in the 1936 Ruhlmann-Langewin plan of the Compagnie du chemin de fer métropolitain de Paris (Metropolitan Railway Company of Paris) for a "métropolitain express" (express metro). The company's post-war successor, RATP, revived the scheme in the 1950s, and in 1960 an interministerial committee decided to go ahead with the construction of an east-west line. Subsequently, the central part of the RER was completed between 1962 and 1977 in a large-scale civil engineering project whose chief supervisor was Siavash Teimouri. As its instigator, RATP was granted authority to run the new link. The embryonic (and as yet unnamed) RER was not properly conceived until the 1965 Schéma directeur d'aménagement et d'urbanisme (roughly: "master plan for urban development"), which envisioned an H-shaped network with two north-south routes. Between 1969 and 1970 RATP purchased the Vincennes and Saint-Germain lines from SNCF, as the basis for the east-west link. Only a single north-south route crossing the Left Bank has so far come to fruition, although the Métro's line 13 has been extended to perform a similar function.

First phase

In the first phase of construction, the Vincennes and Saint-Germain lines became the ends of the east-west Line A, the central section of which was opened station by station between 1969 and 1977. On its completion, Line A was joined by the initial southern section of the north-south Line B. During this first phase, six new stations were built, three of which are entirely underground.

Construction was inaugurated by Robert Buron, then Minister for Public Works, at the Pont de Neuilly on 6 July 1961, four years before the publication of the official network blueprint. The rapid expansion of the La Défense business district in the west made the western section of the first line a priority. Nation, the first new station, was opened on 12 December 1969 and became for the next 8 years the new western terminus of the Vincennes line. The section from Étoile (not yet renamed after Charles de Gaulle) to La Défense was opened a few weeks later. It was later extended eastward to the newly built Auber station on 23 November 1971, and westward to Saint-Germain-en-Laye on 1 October 1972. The latter extension was achieved by a connection to the existing Saint-Germain-en-Laye line, the oldest railway line into Paris, at Nanterre.

The RER network came into being on 9 December 1977 with the joining of the eastern Nation-Boissy segment and the western Auber-Saint-Germain-en-Laye segment at Châtelet – Les Halles. The southern Ligne de Sceaux was simultaneously extended from Luxembourg to meet Line A at Châtelet – Les Halles, becoming the new Line B. The system of line letters was introduced to the public on this occasion, though it had been used internally by RATP and SNCF for some time.

Completion

A second phase, from the end of the 1970s, was carried out more slowly. SNCF gained the authorisation to operate its own routes, which became lines C, D and E. Extensive sections of suburban tracks were added to the network, but only four new stations were built. In this time period, the network was completed in the following stages:

 Line C (along the Left Bank of the Seine) was added in 1979, involving the construction of a link between Invalides and Musée d'Orsay.
 Line B was extended to Gare du Nord in 1981 with a new deep tunnel from Châtelet – Les Halles. It was later extended further northward.
 Line D (north to south-east via Châtelet – Les Halles) was completed in 1995 with the construction of a deep tunnel between Châtelet – Les Halles and Gare de Lyon. No new building work was necessary at Châtelet – Les Halles, as additional platforms for Line D had been built at the time of the station's construction 20 years earlier.
 Line E was added in 1999, connecting the north-east with Gare Saint-Lazare by means of a new deep tunnel from Gare de l'Est.

Finance

The RER's first phase of construction during the 1960s and 1970s was marked by scale and expense. In 1973 alone, FRF 2 billion were committed to the project in the budget. This equates to roughly €1.37 billion in 2005 terms, and closer to double that as a proportion of the region's (then much smaller) economic output. This and subsequent spending was partly sustained by the versement transport, a local tax levied on businesses. The tax was introduced in July 1971 and remains in effect.

Maps

Rolling stock
The predominance of suburban SNCF track on the RER network explains why RER trains use overhead line power and run on the left, like SNCF trains (except in Alsace-Moselle), contrary to the Métro where trains use third rail power and run on the right. RER trains run by the two different operators share the same track infrastructure, a practice called interconnection. On the RER, interconnection required the development of specific trains (MI 79 series for Materiel d'Interconnexion 1979, and MI 2N series for Materiel d'Interconnexion à 2 niveaux (double-deck interconnection stock)) capable of operating under both 1.5 kV direct current on the RATP network and 25 kV / 50 Hz alternating current on the SNCF network. The MS 61 series (Matériel Suburbain 1961) can be used only on the 1.5 kV DC network.

The RER's tunnels have unusually large cross-sections. This is due to a 1961 decision to build according to a standard set by the Union Internationale des Chemins de Fer, with space for overhead catenary power supply to trains. Single-track tunnels measure 6.30 m across and double-track tunnels up to 8.70 m, meaning a cross-sectional area of up to 50 square metres, larger than that of the stations on many comparable underground rail networks.

The first RER rolling stock in fact predated the formation of the RER by 40 years, with the Z 23000 stock used on the ligne de Sceaux (which was thereafter integrated into RER B) from 1937 until 27 February 1987. In 1965 the Z 5300 train was introduced, followed by the MS 61 in 1967 (refurbished 1985-1987 and 2006-2009), MI 79 in 1980, MI 84 and Z 8800 in 1985, Z 20500 in 1998, MI 2N in 1996, Z 20900 in 2001, MI 09 on 5 December 2011, Z 50000 (Francilien) in 2015 and Regio 2N (Z 57000) in 2019.

Many services are performed by double-decker train sets, usually operating in double formations.

Lines

Stations

Ten new stations have been built under the heart of Paris since the 1960s as part of the RER project. The six stations of Line A opened between 1969 and 1977 are:

Nation (1969): deep construction at the Place de la Nation.
Charles de Gaulle–Étoile (1970): deep construction at the Arc de Triomphe.
La Défense (1970): near-surface construction beneath the site of the yet-to-be-built Grande Arche de la Défense, just outside the Paris city boundary.
Auber (1971): deep construction near Gare Saint-Lazare.
Châtelet–Les Halles (1977): near-surface construction on the site of the former marketplace, claimed in 2017 to be the largest underground station in Europe.
Gare de Lyon (1977): near-surface construction beneath and alongside the main-line SNCF station.

Some controversy followed the construction of the Line A. Using the model of the existing Métro, and unlike any other underground network in the world, engineers elected to build the three new deep stations (Étoile, Auber and Nation) as single monolithic halls with lateral platforms and no supporting pillars. A hybrid solution of adjacent halls was rejected on the grounds that it "completely sacrificed the architectural aspect" of the oeuvre. The scale in question was vast: the new stations cathédrales were up to three times longer, wider and taller than Métro stations, and hence 20 or 30 times more voluminous. Most importantly, unlike the Métro they were to be constructed deep underground. The decision turned out to be expensive: around 8 billion francs for the three stations, equivalent to €1.2 billion in 2005 terms, with the two-level Auber the costliest of the three. The comparison was obvious and unfavourable with London's Victoria line, a deep line of  constructed during the same period using a two-tunnel approach at vastly lower cost though with a lower capacity. However, the three stations represent undeniable engineering feats and are noticeably less claustrophobic than traditional underground stations.

Only two stations were inaugurated to complete Lines B, C and D:

Gare du Nord (1982): near-surface construction on two levels.
St-Michel - Notre-Dame (1988): deep construction on an existing stretch of the Line B between Luxembourg and Châtelet - Les Halles with two tunnels, common in other underground systems but unique in Paris. The station is situated on and built at the same time as the Luxembourg Châtelet tunnel.

Two stations were added to the network as part of Line E in the 1990s. They are notable for their lavishly spacious deep construction, a technique not used since Auber. Although similar to the three 1960s "cathedral stations" of Line A, their passenger traffic has so far proved vastly lower.

Magenta (1999): deep construction serving both Gare du Nord and Gare de l'Est.
Haussmann - Saint-Lazare (1999): deep construction serving Gare Saint-Lazare and Auber.

Usage

Journey times, particularly on east-west and north-south routes, have been cut by the RER (and thanks to the cross-platform connection at Châtelet - Les Halles, even certain "diagonal" trips have reduced journey times).

Lines A and B reached saturation relatively quickly, exceeding by far all traffic expectations: up to 55,000 passengers per hour in each direction on Line A (1992), the highest such figure outside of East Asia. Despite a frequency of more than one train every two minutes, made possible by the installation of digital signalling in 1989, and the gradual introduction of double-decker trains from 1998 to 2017, the central stations of Line A are critically crowded at peak times.

Used for leisure journeys, the RER has had a major social impact. By bringing far-flung suburbs within easy reach of central Paris, the network has aided the reintegration of the traditionally insular capital with its periphery. The evidence of this social impact can be seen at Châtelet - Les Halles, whose neighbourhood and Forum des Halles leisure and shopping facilities are popular among banlieusards (suburbanites), in particular from eastern suburbs.

Future developments
Extensions to the RER focus on Line E, which ends at Haussmann - Saint-Lazare, serving only one side of Paris, unlike all other RER lines. Various Line E extensions have been proposed:

 westward from Haussmann - St Lazare to Mantes-la-Jolie.  Plans for this extension include an eight kilometer bored tunnel from the current western terminus at Haussmann - St Lazare, with new stations at Porte Maillot, La Défense, and Nanterre - La Folie, and a connection to the SNCF Normandy line in or near Nanterre, the transfer of the current Line A Poissy service to Line E, and its further extension down the Seine valley to Mantes.
 eastward from Chelles-Gournay to Esbly and Meaux
 eastward from Tournan to Coulommiers

Until the western section is in service, neither of the eastern extensions can be put into service, as the Haussmann - St Lazare station is at maximum capacity because all trains are currently forced to turn around at this station.  Once the western extension is in service, Haussmann - St Lazare will become a through station and the eastern extensions will be possible.  One of the primary reasons for the completion of Line E through Paris is to relieve overcrowding on Line A, especially during peak commute periods.  Construction of the westward extension began in 2013, with the inauguration currently planned for 2023.

A new Line E station initially proposed at Rue de l'Évangile (eventually officially called Rosa Parks) on the approach to Gare de l'Est, opened in December, 2015.

Air quality

The RER has received criticism for its high level of particle pollution during busy periods, essentially due to train braking. Pollution by PM10 particles regularly reaches 400 μg/m3 at Auber, much more than at neighboring metro stations and eight times the EU Commission's daily average limit of 50 μg/m3.

See also

 List of metro systems
 List of RER stations
 List of Paris Métro stations
 Réseau Express de l'Aire urbaine Lyonnaise
 Transport in France
 Île-de-France tramway Line 11 Express
 S-train

Notes

References

Further reading

External links

 RATP (official, in )
 RATP (official, in )
 Interactive Map of the RER (from RATP's website)
 Interactive Map of the Paris métro (from RATP's website)
 Complete track map of the RER system by Franklin Jarrier, 10 November 2015
 Metro-Pole (unofficial, dedicated to Paris public transport)
 BBC News Online - France's answer to Crossrail

 
Electric railways in France
RATP Group
Underground commuter rail